Singaporeans First (SingFirst) was an  opposition  political party in Singapore founded on 25 May 2014 but was dissolved on 25 June 2020.

History and political development

Formation and contests 
In 2011, Tan Jee Say, a former civil servant, was known for his contests in both the general and presidential elections held that year, despite being endorsed by the opposition parties while defeated on both occasions. Tan stood under the SDP banner under the Holland-Bukit Timah GRC (led by Vivian Balakrishnan), where the team attained their party's best result for the election.

After the party was founded, Tan used a stylised adaptation of the simple heart logo, a similar logo when Tan campaigned during his presidential election. Tan also led his 10-member Central Executive Committee, which members also include another former SDP candidate Ang Yong Guan.

On 22 March 2015, SingFirst unveiled a new 12-member Central Executive Committee (CEC) with five new faces at its inaugural dinner. Assistant secretary-general Loke Pak Hoe, assistant treasurer Fatimah Akhthar, and Fahmi Rais stepped down from the CEC.

The party participated in their first general election, where they contested Jurong GRC and Tanjong Pagar GRC, both against the PAP. The party was defeated by the PAP by 20.72% and 22.29%, respectively.

In July 2018, the party was among the seven other opposition parties (Reform Party, Singapore Democratic Party, People's Power Party, Democratic Progressive Party, National Solidarity Party (NSP) and People's Voice Party (PVP), the latter formed by former NSP chief Lim Tean), in a meeting led by former Progress Singapore Party (PSP) member Tan Cheng Bock, on a possibility of forming a coalition for the next election.

Dissolution 
The party chairman, Ang Yong Guan, appeared in a PSP video produced before 7 April 2020, and was subsequently revealed to be PSP's candidate for Marymount Single Member Constituency for the 2020 Singaporean general election during the period between the dissolution of the 13th Parliament of Singapore and the nomination day. On 25 June 2020, Tan Jee Say dissolved the Singapore First party, claiming that this would be in the best interests of a united opposition, by avoiding three-cornered fights between more than two parties in the same constituency. Tan Jee Say subsequently contested under Singapore Democratic Party's banner for the Holland–Bukit Timah Group Representation Constituency in the 2020 general election.

Leadership of SingFirst

Objectives and policies
SingFirst aims to abolish the Goods and Services Tax (GST) and increase social spending.

In its manifesto for the 2015 election, the party states it will:
 Restructure the economy by making it much less dependent on cheap low-skilled foreign labour as it depresses wage levels, lowers overall productivity, sustains low-skill industries and adds to over-crowding. It will review the need to give very favourable foreign-worker quotas to certain industries that are highly dependent on foreign workers since this special treatment is unfair to other industries and distorts manpower policies. For example, shipyards employ 100,000 foreign workers out of a total workforce of 120,000.
 Place high priority on developing local enterprises, for example, small and medium enterprises into major regional or global firms. Grants for development capital will be provided to help them strike out into new areas especially in the high-tech industry. The party has identified two sectors that are sustainable over the long term: education and healthcare. SMEs can develop their expertise in these areas. The party intends to deal with rising rental costs that have affected these businesses.
 Encourage priority to the employment of Singaporeans across all sectors but particularly at PMET and senior management levels. Foreigners should only be hired where specialist skills are missing in Singaporeans. Government-linked companies should start the trend by enrolling more Singaporeans in the executive and management positions.
 Review policies that put Singaporeans at a disadvantage compared to foreign personnel working in Singapore. On the national-service obligation of Singaporean men, the party will review the two-year national-service period in light of technological progress and new organisational methods and training, so the military training period can be shortened meaningfully.

Tan Jee Say said in a televised forum on 1 September that his party did not want the government to issue S Passes to foreigners. Amongst the passes that the Ministry of Manpower (Singapore) issues, the S Pass allows mid-level skilled personnel to work in Singapore. Applicants need to earn at least S$2,200 a month and have the relevant qualifications and work experience.

Electoral performance

References

Defunct political parties in Singapore
Defunct social democratic parties
Political parties established in 2014
Political parties disestablished in 2020
2014 establishments in Singapore
2020 disestablishments in Singapore